Up to No Good is the third solo album by the American musician Peter Wolf, released in 1990 on MCA Records.

Production
The album was produced by Wolf, Robert White Johnson, and Taylor Rhodes. "Never Let It Go" is about the car crash that killed Wolf's high school girlfriend.

Critical reception

The Calgary Herald missed "the juvenile appeal that Wolf lucked into just before he and his J. Geils Band buddies went their separate ways." The Toronto Star wrote that "it's a charming record, a lively and knowledgeable tome that finds its ground somewhere between the Detroit and Philadelphia schools of soul, while standing firm on a harder rock footing."

The Ottawa Citizen labeled some of the songs "classic primal funk with a conscience." The Globe and Mail dismissed the album as "just one more attempt to capitalize on the appealing, but somewhat limited, rockaboogie sound Geils and company milked throughout the seventies."

Track listing
All songs written by Peter Wolf, Taylor Rhodes and Robert White Johnson, unless noted otherwise.
"99 Worlds"
"Go Wild"
"When Women Are Lonely"
"Drive All Night" (Wolf, Desmond Child)
"Up to No Good"
"Lost in Babylon"
"Arrows and Chains"
"Daydream Getaway" (Janna Allen, Wolf)
"Shades of Red - Shades of Blue"
"River Runs Dry"
"Never Let It Go" (Wolf, Will Jennings)

Personnel
Peter Wolf - vocals, background vocals, harmonica
Larry Chaney - guitar
Bobby Chouinard - drums
Jeff Golub - guitar
Vicki Hampton - vocals on "Never Let It Go" and "Arrows and Chains"
Arno Hecht - horns
Jim Horn - horns
Byron House - keyboards, bass
Wayne Jackson - horns
Robert White Johnson - percussion, background vocals
Mike Lawler - keyboards
Sam Levine - horns
Terry McMillan - harmonica
Kim Morrison - vocals on "Never Let It Go" and "Arrows and Chains"
Johnny Neal - piano
Taylor Rhodes - guitar, keyboards, percussion, background vocals
Matt Rollings - piano
Alan St. John - keyboards
Jimmie Lee Sloas - bass
Barry Tashian - guitars
Angus Thomas - bass

Production
Producers: Peter Wolf, Robert White Johnson, Taylor Rhodes
Engineer: Rob Feaster 
Assistant engineer: Paula Montondo
Mixing: Rob Feaster
Mastering: Bob Ludwig
Design: Manhattan Design
Cover painting: Todd Schorr
Photography: Jeff Katz, Bobby DiMarzo

Charts
Album - Billboard (United States)

References

Peter Wolf albums
1990 albums
MCA Records albums